Jeffrey R. Motuzas (born October 1, 1971 in Nashua, New Hampshire) is a former baseball bullpen catcher for the Arizona Diamondbacks.

Motuzas attended Nashua High School.  He was drafted by the New York Yankees in the 13th round (343rd overall) of the 1990 Major League Baseball Draft.  Motuzas played for the Yankees minor league system until he retired from playing in 1996.

Motuzas served as the bullpen catcher for the Diamondbacks from 1998–2013.  Also of note has been Motuzas participating in the Home Run Derby as a Derby pitcher, a role that is almost always filled by players other than actual pitchers.

References

External links

1971 births
Living people
Arizona Diamondbacks coaches
Sportspeople from Bridgeport, Connecticut
Sportspeople from Nashua, New Hampshire
Oneonta Yankees players
Gulf Coast Yankees players
Prince William Cannons players
San Bernardino Spirit players
Albany-Colonie Yankees players
Tampa Yankees players
Columbus Clippers players
Norwich Navigators players
Major League Baseball bullpen catchers